Ahmad Deeb (born 8 May  1987 in Latakia) is a Syrian professional footballer who plays as a defender in Hutteen.

International career
Ahmad Deeb made 1 appearance for the Syria national football team during the qualifying rounds of the 2010 FIFA World Cup.

References

External links 
 Career stats at goalzz.com
  Career stats at Kooora.com

1987 births
Living people
People from Latakia
Association football defenders
Syrian footballers
Syria international footballers
Syrian expatriate footballers
Al-Karamah players
Al-Fateh SC players
Hutteen Latakia players
Expatriate footballers in Bahrain
Expatriate footballers in Kuwait
Expatriate footballers in Jordan
Expatriate footballers in Saudi Arabia
Syrian expatriate sportspeople in Bahrain
Syrian expatriate sportspeople in Jordan
Syrian expatriate sportspeople in Kuwait
Syrian expatriate sportspeople in Saudi Arabia
Nejmeh SC players
Lebanese Premier League players
Expatriate footballers in Lebanon
Syrian expatriate sportspeople in Lebanon
Syrian Premier League players
Al Salmiya SC players
Kuwait Premier League players